Neothalassius is a genus of flies in the family Dolichopodidae from Chile. It was recorded by Brooks & Cumming (2011) from the region, but was undescribed until 2016.

Species
Neothalassius triton Brooks & Cumming, 2016
Neothalassius villosus Brooks & Cumming, 2016

References

Dolichopodidae genera
Parathalassiinae
Diptera of South America
Endemic fauna of Chile
Arthropods of Chile